is a train station on the Osaka Metro Yotsubashi Line in Nishinari-ku, Osaka, Japan.

Layout
There is an island platform with two tracks on the second basement.

External links

  
  

Osaka Metro stations
Railway stations in Japan opened in 1956